The  is an electric multiple unit (EMU) train type operated by the third-sector railway operator Aoimori Railway on the Aoimori Railway Line in Aomori Prefecture, Japan, since March 2014.

Overview
Based on the JR East E721 series EMUs first introduced in 2006, two two-car 703 series trains were manufactured by J-TREC in Yokohama, Kanagawa. Built at a total cost of 800 million yen, one set was purchased directly by the Aoimori Railway, and one set is leased.

Formation
The two two-car sets consist of one motored ("Mc") car and one unpowered trailer ("Tc") car, and are formed as shown below.

The "Mc" car is fitted with one single-arm pantograph.

Interior
Passenger accommodation consists of a mixture of transverse seating bays and longitudinal bench seating. Passenger information is provided by LED displays above the doorways. The trains are equipped with universal access toilets.

History
The two sets on order were delivered from J-TREC's Yokohama factory to Aomori in November 2013. The two sets entered revenue service from the start of the revised timetable on 15 March 2014.

Future plans 
Effectve the timetable revision on 18 March 2023, 703 series will operate as far south as Sannohe Station on the Aoimori Railway Line. Trains currently only operate as far south as Hachinohe Station.

See also
 701 series

References

External links

 Aoimori Railway website 

Electric multiple units of Japan
Aoimori Railway Line
Rail transport in Aomori Prefecture
Train-related introductions in 2014

ja:JR東日本E721系電車#青い森703系電車
20 kV AC multiple units
J-TREC multiple units